The Pyongyang Chewing Gum Factory is a factory that manufactures chewing gum in Pyongyang, North Korea. The plant is run by Korea Ponghwa General.

History 
The Pyongyang Gum Factory began operation in October 2003 in a  floor area facility, located on a  plot of land in Rakrang-guyok. Its annual production capacity was reported to be 1,200 tons. In 2008, it moved to a new location on Tong'il Street, Chung-guyok. The new building was constructed by soldiers from the Korean People's Army.  Kim Jong-il made an inspection of the factory in January 2009. A picture book featuring the factory was published by Korea Pictorial in 2010.

Menu 
Among their products is Unbangul Chewing Gum (은방울 껌). The KCNA reports that it strengthens gums and teeth, prevents dental caries, counteracts tartar and halitosis, and promotes digestion and cerebration. Available flavours include grape, peppermint, and strawberry, in flat, round, and square shapes. There is also a lemon-flavored gum which contains vitamin c. The main ingredients of the gum are edible rubber, sugar, glycerine, flavouring, and natural food colouring.

References

Confectionery companies
Food and drink companies of North Korea
Buildings and structures in Pyongyang
Companies established in 2003
Chewing gum
2003 establishments in North Korea